MediCiti Institute of Medical Sciences (Telugu: మెడిసిటి వైద్య విజ్ఞాన సంస్థ; IAST: Meḍisiṭi Vaidya Vignān Samstha) is an Indian medical college affiliated with Kaloji Narayana Rao University of Health Sciences.

The campus is located in Medchal, thirty kilometres from Hyderabad, in the South Indian state of Telangana.

History
The college is a tertiary-educational institute initiated under Science Health Allied-Research and Education (SHARE), a non-governmental organisation founded in 1985.

The institute's affiliated private hospital in urban Hyderabad served as a primary treatment centre for casualties following the 25 August 2007 Hyderabad bombings at Lumbini Park and Gokul Chat, a popular eatery in the city.

Hospital
The original cardio-thoracic specialty hospital, established in 1992, today functions as a general-practice facility as well as a teaching hospital for the college.

References

External links
MediCiti Institute of Medical Sciences Main Site
SHARE Organisation Homepage

2002 establishments in Andhra Pradesh
Educational institutions established in 2002
Medical colleges in Telangana
Universities and colleges in Hyderabad, India
Healthcare in Hyderabad, India